Taken is an action-thriller television series based on the Taken film series. It is an origin story for Bryan Mills (Clive Standen), the character played by Liam Neeson in the trilogy. The series was commissioned with a straight-to-series-order in September 2015 and premiered on February 27, 2017, on NBC. NBC renewed the series for a second season of 16 episodes on May 9, 2017, which premiered on January 12, 2018. NBC removed the series from its schedule on April 18, 2018, and then announced that it would return on May 26, 2018. NBC canceled the series on May 11, 2018, and the final episode aired on June 30.

Premise
Former Green Beret Bryan Mills must overcome a personal tragedy in order to get revenge while becoming a CIA superspy.

Cast

Main

 Clive Standen as Bryan Mills
 Jennifer Beals as Christina Hart
 Gaius Charles as John (season 1)
 Brooklyn Sudano as Asha (season 1)
 Monique Gabriela Curnen as Vlasik (season 1)
 Michael Irby as Scott (season 1)
 Jose Pablo Cantillo as Dave (season 1)
 James Landry Hébert as Rem (season 1)
 Adam Goldberg as Kilroy (season 2)
 Jessica Camacho as Santana (season 2)

Recurring
 Dominic Fumusa as Harry Ward (season 1)
 Jennifer Marsala as Riley (season 1)
 Simu Liu as Faaron (season 1)
 Ali Kazmi as Marzoki (season 1)
 Layla Alizada as Elena Morales (season 1)
 Peter Outerbridge as James Casey (season 2)
 Christian Bako as Krystiyan (season 2)

Production
The funeral scenes, and scenes in and around the Mills family home were filmed at the Christ Anglican Church and a period home at the corner of George and William street in Port Stanley, Ontario, Canada.

The rest of the series is filmed in Toronto, Ontario primarily at Cinespace Film Studios' Kipling Avenue facility.

At the end of the first season the show was radically overhauled, with showrunner Alexander Cary leaving the series, and Greg Plageman (Person of Interest) coming in as the second season showrunner. With the exception of Clive Standen (Bryan Mills) and Jennifer Beals (Christina Hart), all of the first season main cast exited the series at the same time.

Episodes

Series overview

Season 1 (2017)

Season 2 (2018)

Reception

Critical response
Review aggregator Rotten Tomatoes gives the series an approval rating of 32% based on 28 reviews, with an average rating of 4.98/10, and says, "Taken cast hits the right notes, but overall, the series fails to deliver a compelling narrative distinguished from its source material". On Metacritic, the series has a score of 46 out of 100, based on 22 critics, indicating "mixed or average reviews".

Ratings

Season 1 (2017)

Season 2 (2018)

References

External links
 

2010s American crime television series
2010s American drama television series
2017 American television series debuts
2018 American television series endings
English-language television shows
Live action television shows based on films
American action television series
2010s American crime drama television series
NBC original programming
Television series by Universal Television
Television shows filmed in Toronto
Taken (franchise)